Shikma Schwartzman-Bressler (born July 10, 1980) is an Israeli physicist. A researcher at the Weizmann Institute of Science, she is among those taking part in research at the CERN particle accelerator in Switzerland as a member of the ATLAS collaboration. She is also a social activist and leading figure in the "Black Flag" protests against Benjamin Netanyahu.

Biography 
Bressler was born in Haifa, the second child of four, to a doctor mother and a father who was a senior worker at Elbit systems. She grew up in kibbutz Gvat and Timrat. When she was younger she played basketball in the "Ha'poel Galil Elyon" basketball team and in Israel's youth national team. After her army service, Bressler moved on to play for "Ha'poel Haifa". She retired from basketball after she was injured and began her studies at the Technion. She married and had two children. She later divorced and remarried and has five daughters.

Study and research 
Bressler is a physicist at the Weizmann Institute of Science. She completed her bachelor's degree, with distinction, in physics and mathematics at the Technion, where she also completed her master's degree in physics in 2006 and a Ph.D. in 2011. In 2012, she joined the faculty at the Weizmann Institute.

In 2013, Bressler formed a team at the Weizmann Institute entrusted with the development of detectors and particle physics. This team deals with the development of advanced concepts in the field of radiation detectors. She is an active researcher at the CERN particle accelerator in Switzerland, where she deals with gathering data from the atlas detector in search of physics beyond the standard model of particle physics.

Bressler heads a physics research group in the particle and astrophysics department of the Weizmann Institute and deals with the research into the Higgs Boson

Awards and recognition 
In 2016, Bressler received the Charles Clore award for research.

In 2020, Bressler appeared in TheMarkers list of 100 most influential people in Israel and in Forbes magazine's list of 50 most influential women in Israel.

In 2021, Bressler received the Nathan Rosen Experimental Physics Prize for Young Physicists award from the Israeli Physical Society (IPS).

The "Black Flag" protests 
In March 2020, Bressler founded and led the "Black Flag Protests", along with two of her brothers, Yarden and Eyal, and two family friends. Following the 2020 Israeli legislative elections, President Reuven Rivlin laid the task of forming a government on chairman of the Blue and White party. Outgoing Knesset chairman, Yuli Edelstein, refused to give up his position for the new chairman in an attempt to prevent the establishment of a committee which would convene to deliberate on removing parliamentary immunity of Prime Minister Benjamin Netanyahu. Bressler and two of her brothers initiated protest convoys to The Knesset and protests near the homes of Knesset members and members of the Israel Resilience Party headed by Benny Gantz. The protestors began with three demands. The first, the election of a new chairman for the Knesset after the 3rd elections in a year, while Benny Gantz and the block of parties opposed to the continuation of Netanyahu's rule should be entrusted with the task of forming a government. Their second demand was the establishment of Knesset committees with parliamentary supervision, and the third demand was the legislation of an amendment to the base law pertaining to the formation of a government and regulating government powers so that in the future, a person indicted on criminal charges would not be able to run for Prime Minister. The protest movement spread throughout the country and came to be known as "The Black Flag Protest".

See also
2023 Israeli anti-judicial reform protests, part of the 2023 Israel constitutional crisis and led, among others, by Bressler

References

External links 

Israeli women's basketball players
Academic staff of Weizmann Institute of Science
Israeli women physicists
1980 births
Living people
Israeli activists
Israeli political activists
People associated with CERN